Mucho gusto (English: Nice to meet you) is a Chilean morning television program that aired on MEGA since 2001.

References

External links 
  

2001 Chilean television series debuts
Mega (Chilean TV channel) original programming
Breakfast television